Crassimurex is an extinct genus of sea snails, marine gastropod mollusks, in the family Muricidae, the murex snails or rock snails.

Species

References

 
Gastropods described in 1990